The Marxist–Leninist Communist Party (abbreviated as MLKP) is an underground Hoxhaist communist party in Turkey. It was founded in 1994, and has been involved in the Rojava conflict since 2012.

History

MLKP was formed in September 1994, through the unification of the Communist Party of Turkey/Marxist-Leninist - Hareketi (TKP/ML-Hareketi) and the Communist Workers Movement of Turkey (TKİH). TKP/ML-Hareketi was the larger of the two. Both groups came from the pro-Albanian camp. The unity process of negotiations between the groups had started in 1989. Initially MLKP called itself MLKP-Kuruluş (MLKP-Foundation).

In September 1995, at the first congress of MLKP-K, the Communist Party of Turkey/Marxist-Leninist (New Build-Up Organization) (TKP/ML (YİÖ)) merged into the party, and the name was changed to MLKP. Later the same year a split occurred, and the Communist Party - Build-up Organization (KP-İÖ) was formed.

MLKP is designated as an active terrorist organisation in Turkey by the Counter-Terrorism and Operations Department of the General Directorate of Security. During the Ergenekon investigation, it was claimed by prosecutors that Ergenekon planned to take over the MLKP, as well as the PKK, and that it was successful to a certain extent. In the same investigation, it was found that the hand grenades found in Lieutenant Colonel Mustafa Dönmez' had the same series number as those used by the MLKP.

Organisation
The youth wing of MLKP is called the Communist Youth Organization ( in Turkish, abbreviated as KGÖ).

MLKP maintains an armed wing named Armed Forces of the Poor and the Oppressed (Fakirlerin ve Ezilenlerin Silahlı Kuvvetleri in Turkish, abbreviated as FESK). The group had international exposure at the Hilton Istanbul Bosphorus bombing prior to 2004 Istanbul summit where four people were killed. In April 2015, it was announced that MLKP founded a permanent military training centre in PKK-controlled areas of the Iraqi Kurdistan. In July 2015, they attempted bomb attack on Star Media Group (Turkey).

Human Resources
A study carried out by the Counter-Terrorism and Operations Department of General Directorate of Security over a sample of files about people convicted of being a terrorist under Turkish laws including 826 militants from the organisation and the three other currently active left-wing organisations (see reference 1) 65% of the members are aged 14 to 25, 16.8% 25 to 30 and 17.5% are older than 30.  University graduates make up 20.4% of the members, high school graduates 33.5%, secondary school graduates 14%, primary school graduates 29.9% and illiterates 1.9% (while they have no sampled literate non-graduate members).

Involvement in Syrian Civil War
MLKP has reportedly been sending volunteers to Syria to fight with the PYD's People's Protection Units (YPG) of Rojava (Syrian Kurdistan) since 2012. At least four of these fighters have been killed in battle as of February 2015—one during the Battle of Ras al-Ayn, and three during the Siege of Kobanî. MLKP has also declared its intention to form a leftist international brigade within the YPG, modeled after the famous International Brigades who fought on the side of the Second Spanish Republic in the Spanish Civil War. The party released a video in late January 2015 purporting to show several Spanish- and German-speaking communist volunteers from Europe among its ranks in Jazira Canton. In March 2015, Ivana Hoffmann, a MLKP member and German national and daughter of a German mother and a Togolese father, was reported to be killed in clashes with the Islamic State of Iraq and the Levant.

The MLKP has set up a political branch in PYD-governed territories as well, known as MLKP (Rojava).

MLKP fighters have also joined Kurdistan Workers' Party (PKK) formations fighting in northern Iraq in defence of the Yezidi minority of Sinjar.

See also
 List of illegal political parties in Turkey
 Socialist Party of the Oppressed

References

External links

Etha - news portal related to MLKP
Atılım - newspaper related to MLKP

1994 establishments in Turkey
Anti-ISIL factions in Turkey
Banned communist parties
Banned political parties in Turkey
Communist militant groups
Communist parties in Turkey
Far-left politics in Turkey
Guerrilla organizations
Hoxhaist parties
International Coordination of Revolutionary Parties and Organizations
International Freedom Battalion
Kurdish organisations
Left-wing militant groups in Turkey
Military units and factions of the Syrian civil war
Organizations designated as terrorist by Turkey
Peoples' United Revolutionary Movement
Political parties established in 1994
Political parties in the Autonomous Administration of North and East Syria
Organizations based in Asia designated as terrorist